Thomas Passmore Dickinson (July 20, 1897 – October 29, 1999) was a professional American football player who played three games as an end for the Detroit Heralds of the National Football League (NFL) during their 1920 season. He was an alumnus of Syracuse University and enlisted to fight World War I prior to his professional career, although he never made it overseas. He later served in World War II and the Korean War, retiring from the armed forces as a lieutenant colonel in 1955. Born in Detroit, Michigan, he died in Brown County, Ohio at the age of 102.

References

External links
 

1897 births
1999 deaths
American centenarians
Men centenarians
American football ends
Detroit Heralds players
Syracuse Orange football players
United States Army personnel of World War I
United States Army personnel of World War II
United States Army personnel of the Korean War
Players of American football from Detroit
United States Army colonels